All's Well, Ends Well 2009 or abbreviated as AWEW 2009 is a 2009 Hong Kong romantic comedy film directed by Vincent Kok.  It is the fourth instalment in the All's Well, Ends Well film series, the previous film being All's Well, Ends Well 1997.

The film stars Louis Koo as a "love therapist" who is hired to woo a hot-tempered young woman (Sandra Ng) by her brother (Ronald Cheng) in the hopes of following a family marriage tradition.  Raymond Wong, the producer and co-star of all four films, appears as a private investigator.  All's Well, Ends Well 2009 was released in Hong Kong, China, Singapore, and Malaysia on 22 January 2009 and in New Zealand for one week beginning 29 October 2009.  As with the last three films, All's Well, Ends Well 2009 was released as a Chinese New Year film, where a film's release is timed to coincide with the larger movie audience at that time of year.

Plot 
Kei's (Ronald Cheng) eldest sister Yu Chu (Sandra Ng) is a hot-tempered magazine editor and her temperament has left her single all this while. They have a traditional family and one of the rules is that none of the siblings could get married before their eldest sister. In view of this, Kei sought help from the famous "Casanova," Koo Chai (Louis Koo), who is the new journalist in Sandra’s firm to pretend to court his eldest sister and lure her into the mood of love.

With Sandra falling in love with Koo Chai, she decides to introduce him to her parents (Lee Heung Kam, Ha Chun Chou). However, Koo Chai fell in love with another girl, Mun, during an assignment and this broke Sandra’s heart. To avoid the disappointment of her parents, Sandra asks Mr. Wong (Raymond Wong) a private investigator to pretend as her boyfriend.

With Sandra love life going nowhere and her career plunging low, will she get what she wants? Will Kei find his true love and marries her sister off? Who will Koo Chai choose? Will all’s well end well?

Cast 
 Sandra Ng as Yu Chu
 Louis Koo as Dr. Dick Cho/Koo Chai
 Raymond Wong Pak-Ming as L/Mr.Wong
 Ronald Cheng as Yu Bo/Kei
 Yao Chen as Xiao Yazhen 
 Lee Heung-Kam as Selina, Yu Chu's mother
 Ha Chun-Chau as Yu Chu's father
 Charlene Choi
 Donnie Yen as a wedding guest
 Clifton Ko as Governor
 Danny Chan Kwok Kwan as Web single #2
 Theresa Fu as a birthday party guest
 Cheung Tat-Ming
 Guo Tao
 Vincent Kok
 Ken Lo
 Miki Shum as Mandy
 Alan Mak as a wedding guest
 Yumiko Cheng
 Steven Cheung
 Lam Chi-chung
 Gill Mohindepaul Singh as L's chauffeur
 Vivek Mahbubani
 Sheila Chan
 Fung Bo Bo as a wedding guest
 Celina Jade
 Winkie Lai

Production 
All's Well, Ends Well 2009 is the fourth installment in the All's Well, Ends Well film series. Released twelve years after the last installment, All's Well, Ends Well 1997, the film was directed and co-written by Vincent Kok, who served as a screenwriter for the last three films.  The film was produced by Raymond Wong Pak-Ming, the producer of the series, who also appears in a supporting role.  Sandra Ng, returns in the new installment after appearing in All's Well, Ends Well.  Wong's production company, Mandarin Films, served as a producer and distributor in Hong Kong.  The film was shot with a HK$4million (RM1.86mil) budget.  On 12 May 2008, a press conference was held in a Tsuen Wan shopping mall, where Wong had announced that a HK$4 million investment would be put into making the 2009 version of All's Well, Ends Well. When asked if Stephen Chow or Maggie Cheung would appear in the new film, Wong described that the casting of the two actors would be difficult and was grateful that Sandra Ng would be joining the cast. While developing the film, Wong had immediately thought of working with Sandra Ng, since they had not appeared together after the first film, All's Well, Ends Well.  At the time, Ng had taken a two-year hiatus to raise her daughter.  Vincent Kok had cast Louis Koo and Ronald Cheng as the male leads as he felt that the actors were the new generation of comedians in Hong Kong. Filming took place in China at Qiandaohu, Hangzhou, which is located along the Qiantangjiang River.

Sequel 
Producers Raymond Wong and Wang Chang Tian announced that a sequel to the film, titled All's Well, Ends Well 2010 will release in 2010.

References

External links 
 
 loveHKfilm entry

2009 films
2009 romantic comedy films
Hong Kong romantic comedy films
2000s Mandarin-language films
2000s Cantonese-language films
Beijing Enlight Pictures films
Films directed by Vincent Kok
2000s Hong Kong films